Neil Crone (born May 29, 1960) is a Canadian actor, comedian, writer and motivational speaker. He is known for portraying Fred Tupper in Little Mosque on the Prairie, Jerry Whitehall in Cube 2: Hypercube and the voices of Gordon, Diesel 10 and Splatter in Thomas and the Magic Railroad (2000) and reprises Gordon in the US dub in the reboot, Thomas & Friends: All Engines Go! (since 2021).

He appeared in films with roles as Officer Strauss in New York Minute (2004), Chuck in Hollywoodland (2006), Keith in The Rainbow Kid (2015), Chief Borton in the 2017 remake It (2017) and its 2019 sequel, and George in Through Black Spruce (2018).

His television credits include Bud Topper in the PBS Kids children's television series Noddy (1999–2000), Ed Barnes in the sitcom I Love Mummy (2002–2003), Ray Cooper in Really Me (2011–2013), Chief Crown Attorney Gordon in Murdoch Mysteries (2013–2016), Ollie Jefferson in Wind at My Back (1996–2000) and Mr. Leopold in Endlings (2020–2021).

Early life and education 
Crone was born on May 29, 1960, in Scarborough, Toronto. He attended Sir John A. MacDonald Collegiate Institute and then studied radio and television arts at Ryerson Polytechnical Institute before earning a degree in education from the University of Toronto. He taught English and drama for three years at King City Secondary School before launching his acting career. He would land a role at Toronto’s The Second City Touring Company before moving onto its main stage.

Career 
Crone did the voices of Gordon the Big Engine, Diesel 10 and Splatter from the film Thomas and the Magic Railroad. He provided the voice of Phillip the Concierge in the My Secret Identity episode "Sour Grapes". He has also starred in I Love Mummy, The Red Green Show, the CTV series Power Play, and American Psycho 2: All American Girl. He is also known for being a panelist on the Vancouver-based game show The Next Line and was the host of a children's game show called Wild Guess.

Crone portrayed radio host Fred Tupper on the CBC Television situation comedy series Little Mosque on the Prairie. He also voiced Robert on the animated series Iggy Arbuckle, Reverend McRee in Bob and Doug and Dwayne in Total Drama Presents: The Ridonculous Race. Crone has appeared on international and syndicated shows such as Get Focused Radio with Kate Hennessy.

Crone also played live-action roles such as Maddy's dad, Ray, in Really Me and a cop at protest in Hairspray.

He also writes regular articles for the Durham Region's This Week newspaper.

In 2021, Crone reprised his role as Gordon the Big Engine in Thomas & Friends: All Engines Go, a reboot of the original Thomas & Friends series.

Personal life 
Neil lives with his fiancee Kathryn Kelly in Port Perry.

Filmography

Film

Television

References

External links 

1960 births
Living people
20th-century Canadian male actors
21st-century Canadian male actors
Canadian humour columnists
Canadian male comedians
Canadian male film actors
Canadian male television actors
Canadian male voice actors
Canadian motivational speakers
Comedians from Toronto
Male actors from Toronto
People from Scarborough, Toronto